The 2017 Lehigh Valley Steelhawks season was the seventh season for the professional indoor football franchise and first in the National Arena League (NAL). The Steelhawks were one of eight teams that competed in the NAL for its inaugural 2017 season

Led by head coach Chris Thompson, the Steelhawks played their home games at the PPL Center.

Standings

Schedule

Regular season
The 2017 regular season schedule was released on December 9, 2016

Key: 

All start times are local time

Post-season

Roster

References

External links
Lehigh Valley Steelhawks official website

Lehigh Valley Steelhawks
Lehigh Valley Steelhawks
Lehigh Valley Steelhawks